Erick Orrosquieta (born August 30, 1991), commonly known by his stage name Deorro, is a Mexican-American DJ signed to Ultra Records. He formerly used the name TON!C.

Career

2005–12: Early beginnings
Deorro was born in Los Angeles to Mexican parents. He began his DJ career by playing at local gigs when he was 14. By the time Deorro turned 17, he was already producing his own tracks. In 2012, he was asked by DJ Chuckie to remix his track "Make Some Noise". Deorro's remix landed in the top 50 on Beatport. He has since remixed tracks from multiple international famed DJs such as Steve Aoki, Laidback Luke, and Gareth Emery, among others.

2013–present: Breakthrough
In 2013, he released the track "Yee" on Hardwell's label, Revealed Recordings, which charted in Austria, Belgium, France, Germany, Netherlands, and Switzerland. On 18 March 2014 he released the single "Freak" with Steve Aoki and Diplo. On 24 March 2014 he released the single "Flashlight" with R3hab. He released the single "Five Hours" in April 2014. The track charted in Austria, Belgium, France, the Netherlands, Norway, Sweden, and Switzerland. On 17 May 2014, Deorro announced on his Twitter page he was going to take a break from DJing in order to have a bigger focus in making music and expanding his record label, Panda Funk.  He guest-starred on the MTV series Teen Wolf as the DJ. In August 2014 he released the single "Rambo" with J-Trick. On 18 October 2014, Deorro received the award for highest new entry on the 'DJmag top 100 DJs 2014' contest, he hit spot 19. He also played a half-hour set at the 'DJmag top 100 DJs' event, which took place during ADE in Amsterdam, the Netherlands. In December 2014, he released the single "Perdoname", which achieved success in Poland after its appearance in Microsoft Windows TV commercial. In March 2015, he released a third version of "Five Hours" with Chris Brown, titled "Five More Hours". The song has charted in Ireland, the Netherlands, and Sweden. On 31 March 2017, Deorro released his debut album, Good Evening, which features 26 tracks, including his new single "Rise and Shine". On February 24, 2022, Deorro performed with Pitbull and IAMCHINO on the live-debut of their late-2021 single, "Discoteca", at the 2022 Premio Lo Nuestro awards.

Discography

Studio albums

Singles

As lead artist

Remixes 
2013: Laidback Luke — Pogo (feat. Majestic) [Deorro Remix]
2019: Timmy Trumpet — "World at our Feet" (Deorro Remix)
2020: Armin van Buuren featuring Sam Martin — "Wild Wild Son" (Deorro and Reece Low Remix)
2020: Steve Aoki featuring Agnez Mo and Desiigner — "Girl" (Deorro and Dave Mak Remix)
2022: IAmChino x Pitbull — "Discoteca" (Deorro Remix)

Awards and nominations

DJ Magazine top 100 DJs

References

External links
 

1991 births
Living people
American DJs
Mexican DJs
American musicians of Mexican descent
Hispanic and Latino American musicians
People from West Covina, California
Monstercat artists
Ultra Records artists
Revealed Recordings artists
Electronic dance music DJs